Joseph Lamb was an English football manager. He coached Dutch club side Feyenoord between 1929 and 1930.

Year of birth missing
Year of death missing
English football managers
English expatriate football managers